Rear Admiral William A. Brockett (born 22 February 1914 in Illinois) raised in Litchfield and New London, Connecticut. A naval engineer and author, Brockett served aboard a US gunboat in China at the time of the Battle of Shanghai in August 1937. In 1950, he co-authored with Robert M. Johnston Elements of Applied Thermodynamics, which was required reading by naval engineering students of the United States Naval Academy for over forty years. During the Vietnam War, he was Chief of the United States Navy's Bureau of Ships. He then served as President of the Webb Institute of Naval Architecture from 1966 to 1974. Brockett died in San Diego, California in September 1984.

Education 
Brockett attended the US Naval Academy, lettering in rowing in the same 1933 ceremony that his deputy at BuShips, Charles Curtze, received recognition for his superior performance in gymnastics.

Career 
Lieutenant (JG) Brockett served in Shanghai, China aboard the River gunboat USS Luzon (PG-47). He was temporarily attached to Headquarters Company, Fourth Marines, the so-called China Marines, at Shanghai, China in May 1940. He left Shanghai on 9 June 1940 bound for the US Naval Academy aboard the SS President Cleveland.

As Chief of BuShips, Brockett played a role in the investigation of the April 1963 sinking of the nuclear-powered submarine USS Thresher (SSN-593). He also participated in discussions with NASA regarding the use of stable ocean platforms in lieu of instrumentation ships for the early United States space program.

Brockett and his vice chief, Charles A. Curtze, resigned their posts at BuShips in October 1965 in protest over Secretary of Defense McNamara's increasing centralization of military power in The Pentagon.

Brockett's telegram to the commissioning of the USS Ulysses S. Grant (SSBN-631) was read aloud at the ceremony on 17 July 1964.

Brockett spoke at the commissioning of the USS Gallup (PGM-85) on 22 October 1966.

Honors 
The Webb Institute sponsors an annual scholarship in Brockett's honor.

References 

United States Navy rear admirals
1914 births
1984 deaths
United States Naval Academy alumni
American expatriates in China
United States Navy personnel of World War II